Georgian dance is the traditional dance of Georgia. It stems from military moves, sports games, and dances celebrated during holidays in the Middle Ages. The dance was popularized by the founders of the Georgian National Ballet, Iliko Sukhishvili, and his wife, Nino Ramishvili, 

Two folk dances, Perkhuli and Khorumi, are inscribed on the Intangible Cultural Heritage of Georgia list.

Types of Georgian dance

Kartuli (ქართული)
Kartuli dance is a romantic/wedding dance. It is performed by a dance couple. During the dance, the man is not allowed to touch the woman and must keep a certain distance from his partner. The man's upper body is motionless at all times. It shows that even in love, men must control their feelings. The man focuses his eyes on his partner as if she were the only woman in the whole world. The woman keeps her eyes downcast at all times and glides on the rough floor as a swan on the smooth surface of a lake. There have been only a few great performers of Kartuli including Nino Ramishvili, Iliko Sukhishvili, Iamze Dolaberidze and Pridon Sulaberidze.

Khorumi (ხორუმი)
This war dance originated in  Guria/Adjara, in southwestern Georgia, based on the numerous invasions of the country. The dance was originally performed by only a few men. However, over time it has grown. In today's version of Khorumi, 30-40 dancers can participate, as long as the number is odd. The dance has four parts: a search for a campsite, the reconnoiter of the enemy camp, the fight, and the victory and its celebration. It is strong and simple but distinctive movements and the exactness of lines create a sense of awe on stage. The dance incorporates the themes of search war, and the celebration of victory as well as courage and glory of Georgian soldiers. Khorumi is traditionally accompanied by instruments, and is not accompanied by clapping. Drum (doli) and the bagpipe (chiboni) are two key instruments to  accompany Khorumi. Another unique element of Khorumi is that it has a specific rhythm, based on five beat meter (3+2).

Adjaruli (აჭარული)
Adjaruli also originated in Adjara, which is where it gets its name. Adjaruli is distinguished from other dances with its colorful costumes and the playful mood that simple but definite movements of both men and women create on stage. The dance is characterized with graceful, soft, and playful flirtation between the males and females. Unlike Kartuli, the relationship between men and women in this dance is more informal and lighthearted.

Partsa (ფარცა)
Partsa originated in Guria and is characterized by its fast pace, rhythm, festive mood, and colorfulness. Partsa mesmerizes the audience with not only speed and gracefulness, but also with "live towers."

Kazbeguri (ყაზბეგური)
Kazbeguri originated in the Kazbegi Municipality in Caucasus Mountains of Georgia. The dance was created to portray relatively cold and rough atmosphere of the mountains, shown through the vigor and the strictness of the movements and foot stomping. This dance is performed mainly by men. Costumes are a long black coloured shirt, black trousers, a pair of black boots, and black headgear. Musical instruments include bagpipes, a panduri, a changi, and drums.

Khanjluri (ხანჯლური)
Khanjluri is based on the idea of competition. Khanjluri is one of those dances. In this dance, shepherds, dressed in red chokhas (traditional men's wear) compete with each other in the usage of daggers and in performing complicated movements. One performer replaces another, and the courage and skill overflow on stage. Since Khanjluri involves daggers and knives, it requires tremendous skill and practice on the part of the performers.

Khevsuruli (ხევსურული)
This mountain dance unites love, courage, respect for women, toughness, competition, skill, beauty, and colorfulness into one  performance. The dance starts out with a flirting couple. Unexpectedly, another young man appears, also seeking the hand of the woman. Vigorous fighting between the two men and their supporters ensues. The quarrel is stopped temporarily by the woman's veil. Traditionally, when a woman throws her head veil between two men, all disagreements and fighting halts. However, as soon as the woman leaves the scene, the fighting continues. The young men from both sides attack each other with swords and shields. On some occasions, one man has to fight off 3 attackers. At the end, a woman (or women) comes in and stops the fighting with her veil once again. However, the finale of the dance is "open" –meaning that the audience does not know the outcome of the fighting. Khevsuruli is very technical and requires intense practice and utmost skill in order to perform the dance without hurting anyone.

Mtiuluri (მთიულური)
Mtiuluri is also a mountain dance. Similar to Khevsuruli, Mtiuluri is also based on competition. However, in this dance, the competition is mainly between two groups of young men and is a celebration of skill and art. At first, groups compete in performing complicated movements. Then, the girl's dance, which is followed by an individual dancer's performance of amazing "tricks" on their knees and toes. At the end, everyone dances a beautiful finale. This dance is reminiscent of a festival in the mountains.

Simd and Khonga
Ossetian folk dances. The costumes in both dances are distinguished with long sleeves. The headwear of both the women and the men are exceptionally high. However, in Khonga or Invitation Dance (Ossetian Wedding Dance), men dance on demi-pointe, entirely on the balls of their feet. Khonga is performed by a few dancers and is characterized by the grace and softness of the movements. Simd is danced by many couples. The beauty of Simd is in the strict graphic outline of the dance, the contrast between black and white costumes, the softness of movements, and the strictness of line formations.

Kintouri (კინტოური) and Shalakho

Kintouri portrays the city life in old Tbilisi. The dance takes its name after "Kintos" who were small merchants in Tbilisi. They wore black outfits with baggy pants and usually carried their goods on their heads around the city. When a customer chose goods, a kinto would take the silk shawl hanging from his silver belt and wrap the fruits and vegetables in them to weigh. Kintos were known to be cunning, swift and informal. Such characteristics of Kinto are well shown in Kintouri. The dance is light natured.

Samaia (სამაია)
Samaia is performed by 3 women and, originally, was considered to be a Paganism dance. However, today's Samaia is a representation of Tamar of Georgia, who reigned in 12th-13th centuries and was the first empress of Georgia. There are only 4 frescos that keep the much-revered image of Empress Tamar. Simon Virsaladze based the costumes of Samaia on the Empress's clothing on those frescos. In addition, the trinity idea in the dance represents Tamar of Georgia as a young princess, a wise mother and the powerful empress. All these three images are united in one harmonious picture. The simple but soft and graceful movements create an atmosphere of beauty, glory and power that surrounded the Empress's reign.

Jeirani (ჯეირანი)
The word "jeirani" means gazelle. This dance tells the story of the hunt. It was choreographed by Nino Ramishvili for the Georgian National Ballet. The dance incorporates classical ballet movements and a hunting scene.

Karachokheli (ყარაჩოხელი)
Karachokheli were the ordinary craftsman of Georgia. They typically wore black chokha (traditional men's wear). They were known for hard work yet a carefree life, as well as a love of Georgian wine and beautiful women, all of which are well represented in the dance.

Davluri (დავლური)
Davluri is also a city dance, but unlike Kintouri and Karachokheli, it portrays the city aristocracy. The dance is similar to Kartuli. However, the movements in Davluri are less complicated and the male/female relationship is less formal. The dance is performed by many couples and with the music and colorful costumes, paints a picture of an aristocratic feast on stage.

Mkhedruli
The word "Mkhedari" means cavalryman. The dance begins in a raging tempo, becoming more and more violent. The legs of the cavalryman imitate the fast movements of the horse, while their body and arm movements impersonate the battle with enemy.

Parikaoba
A warrior dance from Khevsureti in northeast Georgia. A girl enters, looking for her beloved. He appears only to encounter others, precipitating an energetic battle with sword and shield. When the girl throws down her headdress, the men must stop according to tradition, only to renew their battle soon after.

Gallery

See also
 Sukhishvili Georgian National Ballet
 Khorumi

References